Mulberry Hill is a heritage-listed home in Langwarrin South, Victoria, Australia. It was the home of the writer Joan Lindsay and her husband Sir Daryl Lindsay from 1926 to 1984. Joan Lindsay left the house to the National Trust when she died. It is still owned by the National Trust and is open to the public. It is also heritage-listed at the federal and state level.

History and description
Mulberry Hill is a two-storey building made of weatherboard, with a tile roof. Initial design was done by Daryl Lindsay, building on a pre-existing cottage from the 1880s. The studio was originally the front rooms of the cottage. Lindsay then engaged Harold Desbrowe-Annear, a successful architect of the 1920s, to develop and finish the house in the American Colonial style. It was built in 1926.

The Lindsays lived at Mulberry Hill until the Great Depression forced them to rent the house out and live in more humble accommodation at Bacchus Marsh until their financial position recovered. Joan Lindsay wrote Picnic at Hanging Rock in 1967 while living at Mulberry Hill. Daryl Lindsay died in 1976. Joan died in 1984 and left the house to the National Trust.

References

External links

Houses in Melbourne
Historic houses
National Trust of Australia
Heritage-listed buildings in Melbourne
Buildings and structures in the City of Frankston
Houses completed in 1926
1926 establishments in Australia